Tegra Nunatak (‘Nunatak Tegra’ \'nu-na-tak 'te-gra\) is the mostly ice-free rocky ridge extending 2.6 km in east-west direction and 700 m wide, rising to 1075 m at the west extremity of Elgar Uplands in northern Alexander Island, Antarctica. It surmounts Delius Glacier to the southeast and Nichols Snowfield to the north and west.  The nunatak was visited on 30 January 1988 by the geological survey team of Christo Pimpirev and Borislav Kamenov (First Bulgarian Antarctic Expedition), and Philip Nell and Peter Marquis (British Antarctic Survey).

The feature is named after the ancient Roman fortress of Tegra in Northeastern Bulgaria.

Location

Maps
 British Antarctic Territory. Scale 1:200000 topographic map. DOS 610 – W 69 70. Tolworth, UK, 1971
 Antarctic Digital Database (ADD). Scale 1:250000 topographic map of Antarctica. Scientific Committee on Antarctic Research (SCAR). Since 1993, regularly upgraded and updated

Notes

References
 Bulgarian Antarctic Gazetteer. Antarctic Place-names Commission. (details in Bulgarian, basic data in English)
 Tegra Nunatak. SCAR Composite Gazetteer of Antarctica

External links
 Tegra Nunatak. Copernix satellite image

Nunataks of Alexander Island
Bulgaria and the Antarctic